Richard Burg is an American retired ice hockey winger who was an All-American for Minnesota.

Career
After a stellar junior career where he was an "All-City" in baseball, football and hockey, Burg began attending the University of Minnesota in 1954. While he initially planned to play all three sports in college, Burg suffered a shoulder injury while playing freshman football that forced him to stop playing both football and baseball. He focused solely on hockey and, when he made the varsity team as a sophomore, he played well. He finished 4th in team scoring in 1956 but both Burg and the team flagged the following year.

As a senior Burg had a resurgence, leading the Gophers with 19 goals and 35 points and was named an All-American. After graduating Burg joined the US National Team, scoring 20 goals in 50 games during the season. He was also a member of the squad at the 1959 World Championships, but has the unfortunate distinction of being the only forward on the team to not score a goal during the tournament. The team could have used a goal from Burg since they finished in a tie with Czechoslovakia for third place and were beaten on the third tie-breaker for the bronze medal (the second tie-breaker was goal-differential).

Burg was not selected for the national team the following year, spending the season with the Minneapolis Millers of the USCHL. After Team USA won goal at the 1960 Winter Olympics, Burg was offered a second stint with the team at the 1961 World Championships. Both Burg and the team performed worse than the last time with the team managing to win just a single game while Burg was limited to one assist in seven games. After that debacle Burg returned to semi-pro hockey in Minnesota, playing two seasons in the USHL before retiring.

Burg was later inducted into the Minneapolis Hockey Hall of Fame.

Statistics

Regular season and playoffs

International

Awards and honors

References

External links

1936 births
Living people
American ice hockey forwards
Ice hockey players from Minnesota
Sportspeople from Edina, Minnesota
Minnesota Golden Gophers men's ice hockey players
AHCA Division I men's ice hockey All-Americans